VAK-308 was a U.S. Navy Tactical Aerial Refueling Squadron. The squadron was established on 2 May 1970 as a Tactical Electronic Warfare Squadron VAQ-308, redesignated as VAK-308 on 1 October 1979 and disestablished on 30 September 1988.

Operational history
The squadron was established as part of a reorganization intended to increase the combat readiness of the Naval Air Reserve Force. It was to provide electronic warfare, tanking, pathfinding and carrier onboard delivery service to the Atlantic and Pacific Fleets and other units around the world. During its lifetime it provided these services to numerous operations, including those during the Indo-Pakistani War of 1971, the Yom Kippur War, and the Turkish Invasion of Cyprus. It was embarked on many different aircraft carriers.

Home port assignments
The squadron was assigned to these home ports:
NAS Alameda

Aircraft assignment
KA-3B Skywarrior

See also
 History of the United States Navy
 List of inactive United States Navy aircraft squadrons

References

Wikipedia articles incorporating text from the Dictionary of American Naval Aviation Squadrons
Aircraft squadrons of the United States Navy
Military units and formations established in 1979
Military units and formations disestablished in 1988